Alison Martino (born December 15, 1970 in Los Angeles, California) is a writer, television producer and historian. She is the daughter of the late singer Al Martino and his wife, American Airlines flight attendant and model Judi Stilwell Martino.

Known as an expert in Los Angeles history, Martino has been referred to as the "Godmother" of old LA and the Sunset Strip. Her knowledge of Los Angeles has been featured in numerous regional publications such as Curbed LA, Los Angeles Magazine, WeHoVille, The Hollywood Reporter and nationally in the Los Angeles Times, Huffington Post and The New York Times. She has also been featured in various television and radio programs such as ABC's Eye on L.A., NPR, and the nationally syndicated shows The Insider, Travel Channel's Baggage Battles, Bizarre Foods: Delicious Destinations and 2018's In Ice Cold Blood, hosted by Ice-T.  In 2019, Alison became an on-air contributor for Spectrum News channel on a series called The SoCal Scene produced by Make Fresh Productions.

As an author she has written numerous articles for Los Angeles Magazine.

Martino is also a successful television producer, spending much of the late 1990s and 2000s in various production television roles, producing multiple episodes of E! Entertainment Television's Mysteries and Scandals as well as the popular reality shows Trading Spaces, Celebrity Rehab and the critically acclaimed Intervention. In 2014, she teamed up with P. David Ebersole and Todd Hughes of The Ebersole Hughes Company to create the web series VLA TV, premiering on her YouTube channel. In 2017, she co-produced a documentary on Jayne Mansfield titled Mansfield 66/67.

In 2010, Martino created the online community Vintage Los Angeles which documents the history of Los Angeles.

References

External links 
 
 Official website
 Vintage Los Angeles

1970 births
Living people
Television producers from California
American women television producers
Writers from Los Angeles
21st-century American women